Gjesåssjøen is a lake in Åsnes Municipality in Innlandet county, Norway. The village of Gjesåsen and the Gjesåsen Church lie along the eastern shore of the lake.

The lake was designated as a nature reserve in 2003. The lake is surrounded by agriculture which use the lake as a source of water. Gjesåssjøen is an important habitat for a number of bird species. About 150 different bird species were observed at the lake between 1996 and 2006, among these rare species such as the grebe and the greylag goose.

See also
List of lakes in Norway

References

Åsnes
Lakes of Innlandet